Vanessa del Rio (born March 31, 1952) is an American retired pornographic actress.

Early years
Vanessa del Rio was born Ana María Sánchez and raised in Harlem, New York, the only child of immigrants from Cuba and Puerto Rico. Her mother would take her to see the Spanish language movies of Isabel Sarli, a passionate, voluptuous Argentinian actress with a charismatic power over men whom Vanessa credits as a big influence in her life. She describes her mother as "an innocent, deeply religious woman who didn't really relate to Sarli's sexuality,"  while her young daughter focused on Sarli's power over men, and wanted that power for herself. After an early childhood as religious as her mother's, Sanchez dropped out of school in the 8th grade, tired of the sheltered life imposed on her at home. She studied coding, and became a computer programmer at age 18, then abandoned the straight life altogether to live in a series of stolen Volkswagen Beetles with a criminal boyfriend. When that adventure ended two years later she   became "a waitress, then a topless barmaid, and finally a go-go dancer" before accepting her first hardcore porn role in the film China Doll because "it paid $150, which was exactly my half of the rent," so she could join a boyfriend in Europe. In her illustrated biography from TASCHEN Publications (Vanessa del Rio: Fifty Years of Slightly Slutty Behavior, 2007) she revealed to editor Dian Hanson that she also worked as a streetwalker and call girl prior to entering adult films.

Career
For her stage name, she took the name "Vanessa" from a childhood friend and "del Rio" from actress Dolores del Río at the suggestion of another friend who was a movie buff.

Del Rio made her first adult film in 1974, and is credited as the first non-white woman to achieve stardom in the adult industry. Her enduring popularity is based on her enthusiasm, genuine passion, talent for specific acts, oversized clitoris and sense of humor, as well as her lush exotic beauty. In a span of 13 years, she appeared in 81 pornographic films and countless "loops" – 10 minute film clips produced for use in sex shop peep shows. Footage from her films has been included in at least 20 compilations marketed as original films due to her tremendous popularity.

Vanessa's talent has been celebrated in lyrics by several rap artists, including Chubb Rock's "Just the Two of Us", Gangsta Boo's "Fuck You", The Game's "House of Pain", Ice Cube's "Roll All Day", and Junior Mafia's "I Need You Tonight" and "Get Money". She had a cameo in the "Get Money" music video.

Though del Rio retired from adult films in 1984, in part due to the AIDS scare prevalent at the time, she returned to make six final films in 1986/87, following a stint as a bodybuilder, including the faux biopic Deep Inside Vanessa del Rio and The Devil in Miss Jones 3 for the notorious punk-inspired Dark Brothers. She then worked as a feature dancer and magazine model until tearing the meniscus in her knee onstage in 1996. After that she used her coding skills to create her own website, produce original content, continued to appear in magazines, and made special appearances at award shows and conventions.

TV / Film appearances
During and after her porn career she appeared on many TV shows as herself, including a 1996 episode of NYPD Blue titled "Head Case" (Season 3, episode #15). In 2008, she made a cameo opposite Bernie Mac as the amourous "full-figured neighbor" in the film Soul Men, which also co-starred Samuel L. Jackson.

Popular culture
Del Rio is mentioned in Junior M.A.F.I.A.’s 1995 single "I Need You Tonight" as well as Ice Cube's "Giving Up The Nappy Dug Out" on Death Certificate (album).

In 2007, the German art book publisher TASCHEN released a deluxe, heavily illustrated biography, Vanessa del Rio: Fifty Years of Slightly Slutty Behavior edited by del Rio's long time friend Dian Hanson.

A feature film, The Latin from Manhattan, based on del Rio's life, written and directed by Thomas Mignone, and starring Vivian Lamolli as del Rio began production in 2019.

Filmography

China Doll (1975) uncredited
Too Young to Care (1975) uncredited
Midnight Desires (1976), Lola
The Night of Submission (1976), Venessa del Rio
Dominatrix Without Mercy (1976), Venessa del Rio
Virgin Snow (1976), Nurse Ratched
Jacquette (1976), Madame X
Domination Blue (1976), Trixie
The Fury in Alice (1976), Marilyn
Temptations (1976), Marla
Reunion (1976), Elizabeth
That Lady From Rio (1976), Number 1
Come with Me My Love (1976), Lola
Sin of Lust (1976), Carlotta
Gulp (1976), Anna
Forbidden Ways (1976), uncredited
Come Softly (1976), June
Bizzare Moods (1976), Norma
Appointment With Agony (1976), Waitress
Odyssey: The Ultimate Trip (1977), first girl in dream
Joy of Humiliation (1977), Elena
House of De Sade (1977), Lucille McLain
Cherry Hustlers (1977), Sally
Teenage Bikers (1977), Wolf
Breaker Beauties (1977), photo lady
Joint Venture (1977), uncredited
The Fire in Francesca (1977), Nadine Rothman
Tell, Teach and Show (1977), Mrs. LaGrange
Exploring Young Girls (1977), Vanessa
Let Me Die a Woman (1977), Sandy (uncredited)
Chorus Call (1978), uncredited
Take Off (1978), uncredited
Woman in Love (1978), Simone Foster
The Final Test (1978), Claudia
Dirty Deeds (1978), uncredited
Babylon Pink (1979), Housewife
N.Y. Babes (1979), Jackie Robbins
Jack & Jill (1979), Rosetta
 Tigresses and Other Man-eaters (1979), Tigress
Her Name Was Lisa (1979), Carmen
The Pink Ladies (1979), Seductress
Fulfilling Young Cups (1979), Rita
Angie, Police Woman (1979), girl on parachute
Justine: A Matter of Innocence (1980), Claudia Kendall
Co-Ed Fever (1980), Vannessa
Afternoon Delights (1980), Mrs. Smith
Dracula Exotica (1980), Vita Valdez
The Filthy Rich (1980), Chili Caliente
Girls U.S.A. (1980), Sherry Spencer
A Scent of Heather (1980), the cook
Platinum Paradise (1981), hooker
Spittoon (1981), uncredited
The Tale of Tiffany Lust (1981), Florence Nightingale
Bizarre Styles (1981), Vanessa
The Love-In Arrangement (1981), Chiquita
The Dancers (1981), Frances
Lips (1981), Maria
Between the Sheets (1981), Shirley
Beauty (1981), Judy Lopez
Foxtrot (1982), Celeste
Top Secret (1982), Juanita
Real Estate (1982)
Luscious (1982), Lush
When She Was Bad (1983), Judy
Silk Satin & Sex (1983), Denise
Foxholes (1983), Vanessa del Rio
Corruption (1983), Erda
Aphrodisia's Diary (1983), therapist
Sister Midnight (1984)
Viva Vanessa (1984), herself
Maid In Manhattan (1984), Juanita
Blue Voodoo (1984), uncredited
The Devil in Miss Jones 3: A New Beginning (1986), herself
Play Me Again Vanessa (1986), herself
Deep Inside Vanessa del Rio (1987), herself
Beyond Desire (1986), Crystal
Dynamic Vices (1987), Roxanne
Doctor Lust (1987), Dr. Lana Lust
Soul Men (2008), full-figured neighbor

Selected television appearances
 NYPD Blue as herself, in the episode "Head Case" (1996)
 When Rated X Ruled the World as herself, in a VH1 documentary (2004)
 SexTV as herself, in the episode "UFO Sex: The Raelians/Jackinworld.com/Vanessa del Rio" (2005)
 Dave's Old Porn Season 2 Episode 4 Artie Lange, Vanessa Del Rio as herself (2012)

Awards
 CAFA Award for Best Supporting Actress of 1980 – Dracula exotica
 CAFA Award for Best Supporting Actress of 1981 – Dancers
 Adult Video News – Hall of Fame
 X-Rated Critics Organization – Hall of Fame

References

External links

 
 
 
 
 
 
 

1952 births
Living people
Actresses from New York City
American entertainers of Cuban descent
American female adult models
American people of Puerto Rican descent
Hispanic and Latino American female models
American pornographic film actresses
Hispanic and Latino American pornographic film actors
People from Harlem
Pornographic film actors from New York (state)